Guiduccio della Porta (died 1423) was a Roman Catholic prelate who served as Bishop of Muro Lucano (1418–1423)

Biography
On 19 February 1418, Guiduccio della Porta was appointed during the papacy of Pope Martin V as Bishop of Muro Lucano.
He served as Bishop of Muro Lucano until his death in 1423.

References

External links and additional sources
 (for Chronology of Bishops) 
 (for Chronology of Bishops) 

15th-century Italian Roman Catholic bishops
Bishops appointed by Pope Martin V
1423 deaths